Amazônia Independente Futebol Clube, commonly referred to as Amazônia Independente, is a Brazilian professional club based in Santarém, Pará founded on 22 June 2021. It competes in the Campeonato Paraense Second Division, the second tier of the Pará state football league.

Stadium

Amazônia Independente play their home games at Estádio Municipal Colosso do Tapajós. The stadium has a maximum capacity of 17,846 people.

Honours
 Campeonato Paraense Second Division
 Winners (1): 2021

Competition record

References

External links
 Amazônia Independente on Globo Esporte

Amazônia Independente Futebol Clube
Association football clubs established in 2021
Football clubs in Pará
Football clubs in Brazil
Santarém, Pará
2021 establishments in Brazil